APEC Schools is a chain of private high schools based in the Philippines. It is one of the subsidiary schools of iPeople, the merger of the education businesses of Ayala Corporation and Yuchengco's House of Investments. APEC Schools currently has branches across Metro Manila and Calabarzon regions.

History
APEC Schools was established in 2013 through a partnership between Ayala Corporation and Pearson's Affordable Learning Fund. Its first branch started with 130 students. In 2016, with the passing of the K-12 law, APEC Schools started offering the ABM (Accounting and Business Management) academic strand for Senior High School.

In 2019, Ayala Corporation and Yuchengco's House of Investments signed and sealed their merger adding APEC Schools to the group of premier universities and colleges such as Mapua University, Malayan Colleges Laguna, Malayan Colleges Mindanao, Malayan High School of Science in Manila, National Teachers College, and University of Nueva Caceres. During the same year, STEM (Science, Technology, Engineering, and Mathematics) academic strand was offered in selected sites.

In 2020, APEC Schools has over 10,300 students in its more than 20 branches.

Educational programs
APEC Schools offers Grade 7 to 12 (Junior to Senior high school) programs under the K–12 program set by the Department of Education.

The school prepares its graduates for either higher education or employment through English mastery, technology immersion, and connection with employer partners. Students have access to tablets and Chromebooks which they use in their classes.

Academic strands 
Accountancy, Business, and Management (ABM) and Science, Technology, Engineering, and Mathematics (STEM) are the available academic strands for Senior High School students.

LifeLabs and Accelerated Career Experience 
LifeLabs and Accelerated Career Experience are APEC Schools-exclusive subjects. LifeLabs lets the students solve community problems and find solutions in the whole semester period through interviews and research. Accelerated Career Experience gives the Senior High Schools students a real-life working experience through APEC Schools' partner employers.

Online learning programs 
In SY 2020–21, in response to the quarantine brought about by COVID-19, APEC Schools launched the APEC Agile Distance-learning program (Grades 7 to 12) and the APEC Flex Homeschool program (Grades 7 and 8). APEC Agile is a teacher-led learning program that has the ability to shift from online learning to blended learning to face-to-face learning. APEC Flex, on the other hand, is a parent-led 100% online homeschool program with regular support from Subject Matter Experts and Course Coordinators.

References

External links

APEC Schools' Facebook page
APEC Schools' Linked account

Mapúa University
High schools in the Philippines
Ayala Corporation subsidiaries
Pearson plc
Companies based in Makati
2014 establishments in the Philippines